The non-marine molluscs of Romania are a part of the molluscan fauna of Romania (wildlife of Romania). A number of species of non-marine mollusks are found in the wild in Romania.

Freshwater gastropods

Neritidae
 Theodoxus danubialis (C. Pfeiffer, 1828)
 Theodoxus fluviatilis (Linnaeus, 1758)
 Theodoxus transversalis (C. Pfeiffer, 1828)

Viviparidae
 Viviparus acerosus (Bourguignat, 1862)
 Viviparus contectus (Millet, 1813)
 Viviparus sphaeridius Bourguignat 1880

Melanopsidae
 Fagotia esperi (Férussac, 1823)
 Fagotia daudebartii acicularis (Férussac, 1823)
 Holandriana holandrii (C. Pfeiffer, 1828)
 Microcolpia parreyssii (Philippi, 1847) - endemic to Romania, extinct since 2015

Bithyniidae
 Bithynia tentaculata (Linnaeus, 1758)
 Bithynia troschelii (Paasch, 1842)

Bythinellidae
 Bythinella blidariensis Glöer, 2013
 Bythinella calimanica Falniowski, Szarowska & Sirbu, 2009 - endemic to Romania
 Bythinella dacica Grossu, 1946 - endemic to Romania
 Bythinella falniowskii Glöer, 2013 - endemic to Romania
 Bythinella feheri Glöer, 2013 - endemic to Romania
 Bythinella georgievi Glöer, 2013 - endemic to Romania
 Bythinella gregoi Glöer & Erőss, 2015 - endemic to Romania
 Bythinella grossui Falniowski, Szarowska & Sirbu, 2009 - endemic to Romania
 Bythinella molcsanyi H. Wagner, 1941 - endemic to Romania
 Bythinella muranyii Glöer & Erőss, 2015 - endemic to Romania
 Bythinella radomani Falniowski, Szarowska & Sirbu, 2009 - endemic to Romania
 Bythinella sirbui Glöer, 2013 - endemic to Romania
 Bythinella szarowskae Glöer, 2013 - endemic to Romania
 Bythinella viseuiana Falniowski, Szarowska & Sirbu, 2009 - endemic to Romania

Hydrobiidae
 Grossuana codreanui (Grossu, 1946)

Lithoglyphidae
 Lithoglyphus apertus (Küster, 1852)
 Lithoglyphus naticoides (C. Pfeiffer, 1828)

Moitessieriidae
 Bythiospeum leruthi (C. R. Boettger, 1940)
 Bythiospeum transsylvanicum (Rotarides, 1943)
 Paladilhiopsis carpathica (L. Soós, 1940)

Tateidae
 Potamopyrgus antipodarum (J. E. Gray, 1843)

Valvatidae
 Valvata cristata O. F. Müller, 1774
 Valvata macrostoma (Mörch, 1864)
 Valvata piscinalis (O. F. Müller, 1774)

Acroloxidae
 Acroloxus lacustris (Linnaeus, 1758)

Lymnaeidae
 Galba truncatula (O. F. Müller, 1774)
 Stagnicola palustris (O. F. Müller, 1774)
 Stagnicola turricola (Held, 1836)
 Radix auricularia (Linnaeus, 1758)
 Radix ampla (Hartmann, 1821)
 Radix labiata (Rossmässler, 1835)
 Radix balthica (Linnaeus, 1758)
 Lymnaea stagnalis (Linnaeus, 1758)

Physidae
 Physa fontinalis (Linnaeus, 1758)
 Physella acuta (Draparnaud, 1805)

Planorbidae
 Planorbarius corneus (Linnaeus, 1758)
 Planorbis planorbis (Linnaeus, 1758)
 Anisus spirorbis (Linnaeus, 1758)
 Anisus calculiformis (Sandberger, 1874)
 Anisus vortex (Linnaeus, 1758)
 Anisus vorticulus (Troschel, 1834)
 Gyraulus albus (O. F. Müller, 1774)
 Gyraulus laevis (Alder, 1838)
 Gyraulus crista (Linnaeus, 1758)
 Hippeutis complanatus (Linnaeus, 1758)
 Segmentina nitida (O. F. Müller, 1774)
 Ferrissia wautieri (Mirolli, 1960)
 Ancylus fluviatilis O. F. Müller, 1774

Land gastropods
Aciculidae
 Platyla banatica (Rossmässler, 1842)
 Platyla microspira (Pini, 1884)
 Platyla polita (Hartmann, 1840)

Pomatiidae
 Pomatias rivulare (Eichwald 1829)

Carychiidae
 Carychium tridentatum (Risso, 1826)

Succineidae
 Succinea putris (Linnaeus, 1758)
 Succinea oblonga (Draparnaud, 1801)

Cochlicopidae
 Cochlicopa lubrica (O. F. Müller, 1774)
 Cochlicopa lubricella (Porro, 1838)

Chondrinidae
 Chondrina arcadica clienta (Westerlund, 1883)
 Chondrina tatrica Ložek, 1948
 Granaria frumentum (Draparnaud 1801)

Orculidae
 Orcula jetschini M. von Kimakowicz 1883 - endemic to Romania
 Sphyradium doliolum (Bruguière, 1792)

Pyramidulidae
 Pyramidula pusilla (Vallot, 1801)

Truncatellinindae
 Columella edentula (Draparnaud, 1805)
 Truncatellina cylindrica (Férussac, 1807)

Valloniidae
 Acanthinula aculeata (O. F. Müller, 1774)
 Vallonia costata (O. F. Müller, 1774)

Vertiginidae
 Vertigo alpestris Alder, 1838
 Vertigo pusilla O. F. Müller, 1774

Enidae
 Ena montana (Draparnaud, 1801)

Clausiliidae
 Alinda biplicata (Montagu, 1803)
 Alinda fallax (Rossmässler, 1836)
 Alinda jugularis (Vest, 1859)
 Alinda stabilis (L. Pfeiffer, 1847)
 Alinda viridana (Rossmässler, 1836)
 Alopia alpina R. Kimakowicz, 1933 - endemic to Romania
 Alopia bielzii (L. Pfeiffer, 1849)
 Alopia bielzii bielzii (L. Pfeiffer, 1849) - endemic to Romania
 Alopia bielzii madensis (C. Fuss, 1855) - endemic to Romania
 Alopia bielzii tenuis (E. A. Bielz, 1861) - endemic to Romania
 Alopia bogatensis (E. A. Bielz, 1856) - endemic to Romania
 Alopia bogatensis angustata (E. A. Bielz, 1859) - endemic to Romania
 Alopia bogatensis bogatensis (E. A. Bielz, 1856) - endemic to Romania
 Alopia canescens (Charpentier, 1852) - endemic to Romania
 Alopia canescens ambigua M. Kimakowicz, 1883 - endemic to Romania
 Alopia canescens caesarea (M. Kimakowicz, 1894) - endemic to Romania
 Alopia canescens canescens (Charpentier, 1852) - endemic to Romania
 Alopia canescens costata (E. A. Bielz, 1859) - endemic to Romania
 Alopia canescens haueri (E. A. Bielz, 1859) - endemic to Romania
 Alopia canescens nefaria (M. Kimakowicz, 1894) - endemic to Romania
 Alopia canescens striaticollis (M. Kimakowicz, 1894) - endemic to Romania
 Alopia glauca (E. A. Bielz, 1853) - endemic to Romania
 Alopia glorifica (Charpentier, 1852) - endemic to Romania
 Alopia glorifica deceptans Deli & Szekeres, 2011 - endemic to Romania<ref name=Deli&Szekeres>{{cite journal |last1=Deli |first1=T. |last2=Szekeres |first2=M. |title=Two new dextral subspecies of AlopiaÄÄ H. & A. Adams 1855 (Gastropoda: Clausiliidae) |journal=Malakológiai Tájékoztató |date=2011 |volume=20 |pages=19-23}}</ref>
 Alopia glorifica elegantissima H. Nordsieck, 1977 - endemic to Romania
 Alopia glorifica glorifica (Charpentier, 1852) - endemic to Romania
 Alopia glorifica intercedens (A. Schmidt, 1857) - endemic to Romania
 Alopia glorifica magnifica R. Kimakowicz, 1962 - endemic to Romania
 Alopia glorifica subita (M. Kimakowicz, 1894) - endemic to Romania
 Alopia glorifica valachiensis O. Boettger, 1879 - endemic to Romania
 Alopia glorifica vranceana Grossu, 1967 - endemic to Romania
 Alopia grossuana H. Nordsieck, 1977 - endemic to Romania
 Alopia grossuana nemethi Deli & Szekeres, 2011 - endemic to Romania
 Alopia grossuana grossuana H. Nordsieck, 1977 - endemic to Romania
 Alopia hirschfelderi Nordsieck, 2013 - endemic to Romania
 Alopia lischkeana (Charpentier, 1852) - endemic to Romania
 Alopia lischkeana boettgeri M. Kimakowicz, 1883 - endemic to Romania
 Alopia lischkeana cybaea (M. Kimakowicz, 1894) - endemic to Romania
 Alopia lischkeana galbina R. Kimakowicz, 1943 - endemic to Romania
 Alopia lischkeana lischkeana (Charpentier, 1852) - endemic to Romania
 Alopia lischkeana livens (E. A. Bielz, 1853) - endemic to Romania
 Alopia lischkeana sarkanyi Szekeres, 2007 - endemic to Romania
 Alopia lischkeana violacea (M. Kimakowicz, 1894) - endemic to Romania
 Alopia livida (Menke, 1828) - endemic to Romania
 Alopia livida deaniana A. H. Cooke, 1922 - endemic to Romania
 Alopia livida julii A. J. Wagner, 1914 - endemic to Romania
 Alopia livida livida (Menke, 1828) - endemic to Romania
 Alopia livida straminicollis (Charpentier, 1852) - endemic to Romania
 Alopia livida vargabandii Fehér & Szekeres, 2019 - endemic to Romania
 Alopia maciana Bădărău & Szekeres, 2001 - endemic to Romania
 Alopia mafteiana Grossu, 1967 - endemic to Romania
 Alopia mafteiana mafteiana Grossu, 1967 - endemic to Romania
 Alopia mafteiana valeriae Szekeres, 2007 - endemic to Romania
 Alopia mariae R. Kimakowicz, 1931 - endemic to Romania
 Alopia mariae coronata R. Kimakowicz, 1943 - endemic to Romania
 Alopia mariae hildegardae R. Kimakowicz, 1931 - endemic to Romania
 Alopia mariae mariae R. Kimakowicz, 1931 - endemic to Romania
 Alopia mariae soosi R. A. Brandt, 1961 - endemic to Romania
 Alopia meschendorferi (E. A. Bielz, 1858) - endemic to Romania
 Alopia monacha (M. Kimakowicz, 1894) - endemic to Romania
 Alopia nefasta (M. Kimakowicz, 1894) - endemic to Romania
 Alopia nefasta ciucasiana Grossu, 1969 - endemic to Romania
 Alopia nefasta helenae R. Kimakowicz, 1928 - endemic to Romania
 Alopia nefasta mauritii R. Kimakowicz, 1928 - endemic to Romania
 Alopia nefasta nefasta (M. Kimakowicz, 1894) - endemic to Romania
 Alopia nefasta zagani Szekeres, 1969 - endemic to Romania
 Alopia nixa (M. Kimakowicz, 1894) - endemic to Romania
 Alopia nixa fussi (M. Kimakowicz, 1894) - endemic to Romania
 Alopia nixa nixa (M. Kimakowicz, 1894) - endemic to Romania
 Alopia plumbea (Rossmässler, 1839) - endemic to Romania
 Alopia plumbea bellicosa (M. Kimakowicz, 1894) - endemic to Romania
 Alopia plumbea plumbea (Rossmässler, 1839) - endemic to Romania
 Alopia pomatias (L. Pfeiffer, 1868) - endemic to Romania
 Alopia pomatias albicostata (M. Kimakowicz, 1894) - endemic to Romania
 Alopia pomatias pomatias (L. Pfeiffer, 1868) - endemic to Romania
 Alopia regalis (M. Bielz, 1851) - endemic to Romania
 Alopia regalis deubeli (Clessin, 1890) - endemic to Romania
 Alopia regalis doftanae H. Nordsieck, 1977 - endemic to Romania
 Alopia regalis glabriuscula (Rossmässler, 1859) - endemic to Romania
 Alopia regalis microstoma (M. Kimakowicz, 1883) - endemic to Romania
 Alopia regalis mutabilis (M. Kimakowicz, 1894) - endemic to Romania
 Alopia regalis nordsiecki Grossu & Tesio, 1973 - endemic to Romania
 Alopia regalis petrensis H. Nordsieck, 1996 - endemic to Romania
 Alopia regalis proclivis (M. Kimakowicz, 1894) - endemic to Romania
 Alopia regalis regalis (M. Bielz, 1851) - endemic to Romania
 Alopia regalis sabinae R. Kimakowicz, 1928 - endemic to Romania
 Alopia regalis wagneri (M. Kimakowicz, 1894) - endemic to Romania
 Alopia subcosticollis (A. Schmidt, 1868) - endemic to Romania
 Alopia vicina (M. Kimakowicz, 1894) - endemic to Romania
 Alopia vicina fortunata R. Kimakowicz, 1931 - endemic to Romania
 Alopia vicina occulta R. Kimakowicz, 1931 - endemic to Romania
 Alopia vicina tamasorum Szekeres, 2007 - endemic to Romania
 Alopia vicina vicina (M. Kimakowicz, 1894) - endemic to Romania
 Balea perversa (Linnaeus, 1758)
 Clausilia cruciata Studer, 1820
 Clausilia dubia Draparnaud, 1805
 Clausilia pumila (C. Pfeiffer, 1828)
 Cochlodina cerata (Rossmässler, 1836)
 Cochlodina laminata (Montagu 1803)
 Cochlodina marisi (A. Schmidt, 1868)
 Cochlodina orthostoma (Menke, 1828)
 Graciliaria inserta (Porro, 1841)
 Herilla ziegleri dacica (L. Pfeiffer, 1848)
 Laciniaria plicata (Draparnaud 1801)
 Macedonica marginata marginata (Rossmässler, 1835)
 Macrogastra latestriata (Schmidt, 1857)
 Macrogastra plicatula (Draparnaud, 1801)
 Macrogastra tumida (Rossmässler, 1836)
 Ruthenica filograna (Rossmässler, 1836)
 Ruthenica gallinae (E. A. Bielz, 1861) - endemic to Romania
 Serrulina serrulata (L. Pfeiffer, 1847)
 Strigillaria cana (Held, 1836)
 Strigillaria rugicollis Strigillaria rugicollis carissima (Rossmässler, 1839)
 Strigillaria rugicollis grossui (H. Nordsieck, 1973)
 Strigillaria rugicollis pagana (Rossmässler, 1842)
 Strigillaria rugicollis rugicollis (Rossmässler, 1836)
 Strigillaria varnensis (L. Pfeiffer, 1848)
 Strigillaria vetusta (Rossmässler 1836)
 Vestia elata (Rossmässler, 1836)
 Vestia gulo (E. A. Bielz, 1859)
 Vestia turgida (Rossmässler, 1836)

Ferussaciidae
 Cecilioides acicula (O.F. Müller, 1774)

Discidae
 Discus ruderatus (Férussac, 1821)
 Discus rotundatus (O.F. Müller, 1774)
 Discus perspectivus (M. von Mühlfeldt, 1816)

Punctidae
 Punctum pygmaeum (Draparnaud, 1801)

Euconulidae
 Euconulus fulvus (O.F. Müller, 1774)

Gastrodontidae
 Aegopinella epipedostoma (Fagot, 1879)
 Aegopinella minor (Stabile, 1864)
 Aegopinella pura (Alder, 1830)
 Nesovitrea hammonis (Ström, 1765)
 Nesovitrea petronella (L. Pfeiffer, 1853)
 Zonitoides nitidus (O. F. Müller, 1774)

Pristilomatidae
 Troglovitrea argintarui Negrea & A. Riedel, 1968 - endemic to Romania
 Vitrea botterii (L. Pfeiffer, 1853)
 Vitrea contracta (Westerlund, 1870)
 Vitrea crystallina (O.F. Müller, 1774)
 Vitrea diaphana (Studer, 1820)
 Vitrea erjaveci (Brusina, 1870)
 Vitrea jetschini (M. von Kimakowicz, 1890) - endemic to Romania
 Vitrea subcarinata (Clessin 1877) - endemic to Romania
 Vitrea subrimata (Reinhardt, 1870)
 Vitrea szekeresi Deli & Subai, 2011 - endemic to Romania
 Vitrea transsylvanica (Clessin, 1877)

Oxychilidae
 Carpathica denticulata Grossu, 1969
 Carpathica calophana (Westerlund, 1881)
 Carpathica langi (L. Pfeiffer, 1846)
 Cellariopsis deubeli (A. J. Wagner, 1914)
 Cibania transsilvanica (E. A. Bielz, 1859)
 Daudebradia brevipes (Draparnaud, 1805)
 Daudebardia dacica Grossu, 1969
 Daudebardia parvula Grossu, 1969
 Daudebardia rufa (Draparnaud, 1805)
 Mediterranea depressa (Sterki, 1880)
 Mediterranea hydatinus (Rossmässler, 1838)
 Mediterranea inopinata (Uličný, 1887)
 Mediterranea montivaga (M. Kimakowicz, 1890)
 Morlina glabra striaria (Rossmässler, 1835)
 Oxychilus draparnaudi (H. Beck, 1837)
 Schistophallus oscari (M. Kimakowicz, 1883) - endemic to Romania

Boettgerillidae
 Boettgerilla pallens Simroth, 1912

Milacidae
 Milax gagates (Draparnaud, 1801)
 Tandonia cristata (Kaleniczenko, 1851)
 Tandonia kusceri (H. Wagner, 1931)
 Tandonia rustica (Millet, 1843)

Agriolimacidae
 Deroceras agreste (Linnaeus, 1758)
 Deroceras bureschi (Wagner, 1934)
 Deroceras laeve (O.F. Müller, 1774)
 Deroceras moldavicum (Grossu & Lupu, 1961) 
 Deroceras occidentalis (Grossu & Lupu, 1966) 
 Deroceras reticulatum (O.F. Müller, 1774)
 Deroceras rodnae Grossu & Lupu, 1965 
 Deroceras sturanyi (Simroth, 1894)
 Deroceras turcicum (Simroth, 1894) 
 Krynickillus urbanskii (Wiktor, 1971)

Limacidae
 Ambigolimax nyctelius (Bourguignat, 1861)
 Ambigolimax valentiana (Férussac, 1822)
 Bielzia coerulans (M. Bielz, 1851)
 Lehmannia horezia Grossu & Lupu, 1962
 Lehmannia jaroslaviae Grossu, 1967
 Lehmannia macroflagellata Grossu & Lupu, 1962
 Lehmannia marginata (O.F. Müller, 1774)
 Lehmannia medioflagellata Lupu, 1968
 Lehmannia vrancensis Lupu, 1973
 Limacus flavus (Linnaeus, 1758)
 Limacus maculatus (Kaleniczenko 1851)
 Limax cinereoniger Wolf, 1801
 Limax dobrogicus Grossu & Lupu, 1960
 Limax maximus Linnaeus, 1758
 Malacolimax tenellus (O.F. Müller, 1774)

Vitrinidae
 Eucobresia diaphana (Draparnaud, 1805)
 Eucobresia nivalis (Dummont & Mortillet, 1854)
 Hesselimax kotulae (Westerlund, 1883)
 Oligolimax annularis (Studer, 1820)
 Semilimacella bonellii reitterii (O. Boettger, 1880)
 Semilimax semilimax (Férussac, 1802)
 Vitrina pellucida (O.F. Müller, 1774)

Arionidae
 Arion brunneus Lehmann, 1862
 Arion circumscriptus Johnston, 1828
 Arion fasciatus (Nilsson, 1823)
 Arion hortensis (Férussac, 1819)
 Arion subfuscus (Draparnaud, 1805)
 Arion vulgaris Moquin-Tandon, 1855

Camaenidae
 Fruticicola fruticum (O. F. Müller, 1774)

Geomitridae
 Cernuella cisalpina (Rossmässler, 1837)
 Cernuella virgata (Da Costa, 1778)
 Cochlicella acuta (O.F. Müller, 1774)
 Helicopsis cereoflava (M. Bielz, 1851)
 Helicopsis filimargo (Krynicki, 1833)
 Helicopsis lunulata (Krynicki, 1833)
 Helicopsis striata (O. F. Müller, 1774)
 Xerolenta obvia (Menke, 1828)
 Xerolenta spiruloides (A. J. Wagner, 1916)
 Xeropicta derbentina (Krynicki, 1836)
 Xeropicta krynickii (Krynicki, 1833)

Helicidae
 Arianta aethyops (M. Bielz, 1851)
 Arianta arbustorum (Linnaeus, 1758)
 Arianta hessei (M. Kimakowicz, 1883) - endemic to Romania
 Campylaea planospira planospira (Lamarck, 1822)
 Cattania balcanica (L. Pfeiffer, 1853)
 Cattania trizona (Rossmässler, 1835)
 Caucasotachea vindobonensis (C. Pfeiffer, 1828)

 Cepaea hortensis (O. F. Müller, 1774)
 Cepaea nemoralis (Linnaeus, 1758)
 Drobacia banatica (Rossmässler, 1838)
 Eobania vermiculata (O. F. Müller, 1774)
 Faustina barcensis (M. Kimakowicz, 1890) - endemic to Romania
 Faustina faustina (Stabille, 1884)
 Faustina kiralikoeica (M. Kimakowicz, 1890) - endemic to Romania
 Faustina rossmaessleri (L. Pfeiffer, 1842)
 Helix albescens Rossmaessler, 1839
 Helix lucorum Linnaeus, 1758
 Helix lutescens Rossmässler, 1837
 Helix pomatia Linnaeus, 1758
 Helix thessalica O. Boettger, 1886
 Isognomostoma isognomostomos (Schröter, 1784)

Helicodontidae
 Lindholmiola corcyrensis (Rossmässler, 1838)
 Soosia diodonta (A. Férussac, 1832)

Hygromiidae
 Edentiella bielzi (E. A. Bielz, 1860)
 Edentiella edentula (Draparnaud, 1805)
 Euomphalia mediata (Westerlund, 1888)
 Euomphalia strigella (Draparnaud, 1801)
 Lozekia deubeli (M. Kimakowicz, 1890) - endemic to Romania
 Lozekia transsylvanica (Westerlund, 1876) - endemic to Romania
 Monacha cantiana (Montagu, 1803)
 Monacha cartusiana (O.F. Müller, 1774)
 Monachoides bacescui Grossu, 1979 - endemic to Romania
 Monachoides incarnatus (O.F. Müller, 1774)
 Monachoides vicinus (Rossmässler, 1842)
 Perforatella bidentata (Gmelin, 1791)
 Perforatella dibothrion (E. A. Bielz, 1860) - endemic to Romania
 Petasina unidentata (Draparnaud, 1805)
 Plicuteria lubomirski (Ślósarski, 1881)
 Pseudotrichia rubiginosa (Rossmässler, 1838)
 Trochulus hispidus (Linnaeus, 1758)
 Trochulus sericeus (Draparnaud, 1801)
 Urticicola umbrosus (C. Pfeiffer, 1828)
 Xerocampylaea zelebori (L. Pfeiffer, 1853)

Freshwater bivalves

Unionidae
 Unio pictorum (Linnaeus, 1758)
 Unio tumidus Philipsson, 1788
 Unio crassus Lamarck, 1819
 Anodonta cygnea (Linnaeus, 1758)
 Anodonta anatina (Linnaeus, 1758)
 Sinanodonta woodiana (Lea, 1834)
 Pseudanodonta complanata (Rossmässler, 1835)

Corbiculidae
 Corbicula fluminea (O. F. Müller, 1774)

Sphaeriidae
 Sphaerium corneum (Linnaeus, 1758)
 Sphaerium rivicola (Lamarck, 1818)
 Musculium lacustre (O. F. Müller, 1774)
 Pisidium amnicum (O. F. Müller, 1774)
 Pisidium casertanum (Poli, 1791)
 Pisidium personatum Malm, 1855
 Pisidium henslowanum (Sheppard, 1823)
 Pisidium milium Held, 1836
 Pisidium subtruncatum Malm, 1855
 Pisidium moitessierianum (Paladilhe, 1866)

Dreissenidae
 Dreissena polymorpha (Pallas, 1771)
 Dreissena bugensis'' (Andrusov, 1897)

See also

Lists of molluscs of surrounding countries:
 List of non-marine molluscs of Bulgaria
 List of non-marine molluscs of Hungary
 List of non-marine molluscs of Moldova
 List of non-marine molluscs of Serbia
 List of non-marine molluscs of Ukraine

References

Molluscs
Romania
Romania